Wilhelmus (full title: Wilhelmus van Nassouwe) is the national anthem of the Kingdom of the Netherlands.

Wilhelmus may also refer to:

People with the given name Wilhelmus

 Wilhelmus à Brakel (1635–1711), Dutch Protestant Reformation theologian and minister
 Wilhelmus Beekman (1623–1707), Dutch-US politician
 Wilhelmus Bekkers (1890–1957), Dutch tug-of-war Olympic medalist and swimming instructor
 Wilhelmus Beurs (1656–1700), Dutch Golden Age painter
 Wilhelmus Braams (1886–1955), Dutch long-distance runner
 Wilhelmus Bryan (born ?), US documentary film producer
 Wilhelmus Demarteau (1917–2012), Dutch Roman Catholic prelate
 Wilhelmus Doll (1900–1980), Dutch wrestler and Olympic competitor
 Wilhelmus Simon Petrus Fortuijn (1948–2002), known as Pim Fortuyn, Dutch politician, civil servant, sociologist, author and professor
 Wilhelmus Frederik van Leeuwen (1860–1930), Dutch politician, mayor of Amsterdam (1901–10), and lawyer
 Wilhelmus Luijpen (1922–1980), Dutch philosopher and Catholic priest
 Wilhelmus Luxemburg (1929–2018), Netherlands-born US mathematician
 Wilhelmus Nuyens (1823–1894), Dutch historian
 Wilhelmus Wilhelmius (1720–1771), Dutch minister, mathematician, and philosopher
 Wilhelmus Zakaria Johannes (1895–1952), Indonesian radiologist

People with the surname Wilhelmus

 Joop Wilhelmus (1943–1994), Dutch pornographer and entrepreneur

Other uses
 De Wilhelmus, the grand ducal anthem of Luxembourg
 Fort Wilhelmus, a fort on Burlington Island, New Jersey, USA

Dutch masculine given names
Dutch-language surnames